The Razer Hydra (previously known as Sixense TrueMotion) is a motion and orientation detection game controller developed by Sixense Entertainment, a company founded in 2007, in partnership with Razer USA. It uses a weak magnetic field to detect the absolute position and orientation of the controllers with a precision, as stated by its developers, of 1 mm and 1°; it has six degrees of freedom. The current release is wired, but a wireless version was in development.

The game controller has been showcased many times with different video games and 3D modeling applications, most prominently Counter-Strike: Global Offensive, Portal 2, Team Fortress 2, Left 4 Dead 2, World of Goo, Call of Duty: Black Ops and Half-Life 2.

A partnership with Valve was announced, and said company appears as a partner, alongside Razer and Intel. No word has been said by the game developer but they helped Valve modify Left 4 Dead 2 and other Valve games to be played with the Razer Hydra Motion control, and an official SDK is available for download in Steam's 'Tools' page.

It was subject to a demo under the name Sixense Truemotion and tested to a close focus group of PlayStation Underground Members in August 2008, where its full functionality in various types of games was shown.

It is now called the Razer Hydra and has been released through Steam and Razer's official website on June 16, 2011, for US$139.99. It is being sold in a bundle with Portal 2, which has exclusive content for those with the controller. Support for many other games is either implemented or planned. According to a forum post, from December 2010, Sixense is also working on musical control with the controller.

Portal 2
The Razer Hydra comes bundled with an enhanced version of Portal 2. It features a more advanced portal gun with new gameplay mechanics. One new ability is Portal Surfing, which lets the portal gun drag, move and rotate either portal after it has been created. Another is 1-to-1 mode with the portal gun's object carrying beam, which lets you extend the beam many metres and freely move and rotate the carried object in 6 degrees of freedom.

It includes the full Portal 2 game, plus a new set of tutorial levels to teach the new mechanics, and two more sets of levels based around the new mechanics.

The default controls for the game allow the player to look around, or move and rotate the carried object or portal, by moving their right hand. Flicking the left hand up, or pressing a button on the right controller, makes you jump. The left analog stick controls movement. The triggers fire or move portals.

Game compatibility

 A Reckless Disregard for Gravity
 Alien Swarm
 Amnesia: The Dark Descent
 And Yet It Moves
 Assassin's Creed II
 Assassin's Creed: Brotherhood
 Audiosurf
 Batman: Arkham Asylum
 Battlefield: Bad Company 2
 Beyond Good and Evil
 BioShock
 BioShock 2
 Bit.Trip Runner
 Borderlands
 Borderlands 2
 Bulletstorm
 Civilization IV
 Civilization V
 Call of Duty 4: Modern Warfare
 Call of Duty: World at War
 Call of Duty: Modern Warfare 2
 Call of Duty: Black Ops
 Company of Heroes
 Company of Heroes: Opposing Fronts
 Company of Heroes: Tales of Valor
 Crysis 2
 Darksiders
 DeathSpank
 Defense Grid
 Deus Ex
 Deus Ex: Invisible War
 Dog Fighter
 Doom 3
 Eversion
 Fallout 3
 Fallout: New Vegas
 Galcon Fusion
 Grand Theft Auto III
 Grand Theft Auto IV
 Grand Theft Auto: Vice City
 Half-Life 2
 Half-Life
 Hitman
 Hitman 2: Silent Assassin
 Hoard
 Just Cause 2
 Kane & Lynch: Dead Men
 Kane & Lynch 2: Dog Days
 Killing Floor
 Larva Mortus
 Left 4 Dead
 Left 4 Dead 2
 Lego Star Wars III: The Clone Wars
 Lego Batman: The Videogame
 Lego Harry Potter: Years 1–4
 Lego Indiana Jones: The Original Adventures
 Lego Star Wars: The Complete Saga
 Lucidity
 Machinarium
 Magicka
 Mass Effect
 Mass Effect 2
 Max Payne
 Max Payne 2: The Fall of Max Payne
 Metro 2033
 Mirror's Edge
 Monday Night Combat
 Mount & Blade
 Mount & Blade: Warband
 Obulis
 Oddworld: Abe's Exoddus
 Oddworld: Abe's Oddysee
 Osmos
 Painkiller
 Painkiller: OVERDOSE
 Peggle
 Plain Sight
 Plants vs. Zombies
 Poker Night at the Inventory
 Portal
 Portal 2
 Psychonauts
 QuantZ
 Red Faction II
 Red Faction: Guerrilla
 Resident Evil 5
 Return to Castle Wolfenstein
 RollerCoaster Tycoon 3
 Rush
 S.T.A.L.K.E.R.
 Sam and Max 101
 Serious Sam HD
 Shadowgrounds
 Shadowgrounds: Survivor
 Shatter
 The Sims 3
 Singularity
 Splinter Cell: Conviction
 Super Laser Racer
 Super Meat Boy
 Surgeon Simulator 2013
 Swarm Arena
 Team Fortress 2
 The Ball (video game)
 The Elder Scrolls IV:Oblivion
 The Void
 The Wonderful End of the World
 Titan Fall 
 Titan Quest
 Titan Quest: Immortal Throne
 Toki Tori
 Torchlight
 Trials 2: Second Edition
 Trine
 VRChat
 Warhammer 40,000
 Windosill
 World of Goo
 Worms Reloaded
 Yosumin!
 Zeno Clash

See also
 Virtuix Omni
 Haptic suit

References

Game controllers
Pointing devices